Trunk 16 is part of the Canadian province of Nova Scotia's system of Trunk Highways.

From Monastery, Trunk 16 follows the Tracadie River south to Boylston, where it crosses the Milford Haven River. The road then runs along the west bank of the river to its mouth at Guysborough, where it continues eastward along the coast of Chedabucto Bay to the road's end in Canso.

Major intersections

References

016
Roads in Antigonish County, Nova Scotia
Roads in Guysborough County, Nova Scotia